Edward Warner (1818 – 7 March 1875) was an English Whig politician.

He was a Member of Parliament for Norwich from 1852 to 1857, and from 1860 to 1868.

References

External links
 

1818 births
1875 deaths
Liberal Party (UK) MPs for English constituencies
Whig (British political party) MPs for English constituencies
UK MPs 1852–1857
UK MPs 1859–1865
UK MPs 1865–1868